CIT, the Compagnia Italiana Turismo, was an Italian travel agency and tourism promotion quango, privatized in 1996.

It was established by royal charter in 1927 as the Fascist tourist promotion agency, in contrast to the Liberal ENIT and the bourgeois Touring Club Italiano. Its first president was Ezio Maria Gray, an enthusiastic Fascist and corporatist.

Its goal was to promote Italy as an international tourist destination and to support Italian foreign tourism. To do this, it created a network of travel agencies in Italy and worldwide.  Its founding members were the Ferrovie dello Stato, the Banco di Sicilia, the Banco di Napoli, and ENIT (the Italian national tourist board).

After its 1996 privatization, CIT was never able to establish itself financially, and was liquidated in bankruptcy court in Milan in 2008.

References
 
 Taina Syrjäma, Visitez l'Italie : Italian state tourist propaganda abroad 1919-1943: administrative structure and practical realization, 1997 in Turun yliopiston julkaisuja/Annales Universitatis Turkuensis Series B, Humaniora, 217.  (not seen)

Notes

Travel and holiday companies of Italy
Tourism agencies
Transport companies established in 1927
Transport companies disestablished in 2008
Italian companies established in 1927
Italian companies disestablished in 2008